Mount Brecher is a jagged rock mountain,  high, standing immediately west of Mount LeSchack in the northern Wisconsin Range, Horlick Mountains. It was mapped by the United States Geological Survey from surveys and from U.S. Navy air photos, 1959–60, and named by the Advisory Committee on Antarctic Names for Henry H. Brecher, a member of the Byrd Station winter party, 1960, who returned to Antarctica to do glaciological work in several succeeding summer seasons.

References
 

Mountains of Marie Byrd Land